The 2011 Continental Tire Sports Car Challenge was the eleventh running of the Grand-Am Cup Series, the a grand touring and touring car racing series run by the Grand American Road Racing Association.  It began on January 27 and ran ten rounds.

Schedule

Calendar and results

External links
2011 Continental Tire Sports Car Challenge season schedule

2011
Continental Tire Sports Car Challenge